Teitanblood is a Spanish extreme metal band formed in 2003. Based in Madrid, the band currently consists of NSK (vocals, guitar, bass) and J (drums). The band released its debut album, Seven Chalices in 2009. Its follow-up, Death, was released 13 May 2014 via The Ajna Offensive and Norma Evangelium Diaboli record labels. The latter record was included on Decibel magazine’s list of Top 40 Albums Of 2014 as number 26.

Teitanblood's music is generally labeled as death metal and black metal. The band's debut was described by BrooklynVegan as "the most discordant, destructive, and ultimately unfucwitable blackened death in a long time", and their follow-up album was labeled by Pitchfork as "a weaponized hybrid of the two genres". The band's music also features influences from bands such as Repulsion, Necrovore and early Incantation, as well as Chris Reifert's death-doom work and thrash metal.

Members
Current members
NSK - bass, guitar, vocals (2003-present)
J - drums (2005-present)
 Javi Bastard (Javier Félez) - guitar (2017-present)
 CG Santos – effects, programming (2008-present)

Former members
Tyrant Spear Carrier of Barbaric Blood Sacrifice (Defernos) – drums (2003-2005)
Juan Carlos Deus – guitar (2003-2009)

Discography
Studio albums
 Seven Chalices (2009)
 Death (2014)
 The Baneful Choir (2019)

EPs and splits
 Proclamation / Teitanblood (2005)
 Teitanblood / Necros Christos (2006)
 Purging Tongues (2011)
 Woven Black Arteries (2012)
 Accursed Skin (2016)

Compilations
 Black Putrescence of Evil (2009)

Demos
 Genocide Chants to Apolokian Dawn (2004)

References

External links
 

Musical groups established in 2003
Spanish death metal musical groups
Spanish black metal musical groups
Blackened death metal musical groups
Musical groups from Madrid
Heavy metal duos